Ruggiero Gabaleone di Salmour (January 14, 1806 – March 6, 1878) was an Italian politician and economist. He served in the Senate of the Kingdom of Sardinia.

Works
Notizie sopra le principali Istituzioni di credito agrario, Torino, 1845.
Del credito fondiario negli Stati Sardi, Torino, 1853.
Del credito fondiario e del credito agricolo in Francia e in Italia, Torino, 1862.

External links

Salmour, Ruggero Gabaleone conte di la voce in L'Unificazione (2011), sito Treccani.it L'Enciclopedia Italiana. URL visitato il 26 dicembre 2012.

1806 births
1878 deaths
Italian economists
19th-century Italian politicians
Members of the Senate of the Kingdom of Sardinia